Libero De Rienzo (February 24, 1977 – July 15, 2021) was an Italian film actor, director, and screenwriter.

Career
De Rienzo was born in Naples and raised in Rome.

In 2001, De Rienzo appeared in three films: Fat Girl, Gioco con la morte, and Santa Maradona. He received a David di Donatello award for best supporting actor for his work in Santa Maradona. In 2004, De Rienzo starred in A/R andata+ritorno.

As of 2005 Blood, Death Does Not Exist has been released, a film which De Rienzo acted in, wrote, and directed. Blood, Death Does Not Exist won the Best Feature and the Grand Chameleon Awards at the Brooklyn Film Festival in 2006.

He acted in television productions, including the miniseries Nassiryia - Per non Dimenticare; My House in Umbria; and Aldo Moro - Il Presidente. He also appeared in the 2009 film Fortapasc.

De Rienzo died at his home in Rome on the evening of July 15, 2021, from a heart attack. He was 44. The Procura of Roma has opened file and investigation into death as result of another crime. An autopsy was ordered for suspected drug use. On September 30, 2021, it was confirmed that De Rienzo died of an accidental drug overdose.

Filmography

Television

References

External links

1977 births
2021 deaths
Film people from Naples
Italian male film actors
David di Donatello winners
Male actors from Naples
Drug-related deaths in Italy